Cathy Ang (born January 24, 1996) is an American actress. She is best known for voicing Fei Fei in Netflix's Over the Moon, as well as her television role as Lily Goldenblatt in the Sex and the City spinoff series And Just Like That...

Ang was born to Chinese-Filipino parents in Fort Dodge, Iowa, but spent much of her childhood in Cupertino, California. Ang attended New York University, where she received a Bachelor of Music in Vocal Performance from the Steinhardt School of Culture, Education, and Human Development. She graduated in 2017.

Filmography

References

External links

Living people
1995 births
American film actresses
American stage actresses
American television actresses
American actresses of Filipino descent
American actresses of Chinese descent
21st-century American women
New York University alumni